The Turtles of Venezuela is an identification guide of the Testudines families that are found in Venezuela, written by zoologist Pedro Trebbau and herpetologist Peter Pritchard. It was originally published in English in 1984, by the Society for the Study of Amphibians and Reptiles as the Number 2 of the series Contributions to herpetology.

In 2016 was published the Spanish version by Oscar Todtmann Editores, with more than 130 pictures and illustrations, a presentation by Ph.D. Carlos Rivero Blanco and a prologue by Ph.D. Vivian Pérez.

A new edition was presented in 2018 by Editorial La Fauna, in Madrid, Spain. It features a dedication to conservationist Saúl Gutiérrez Eijuri (1960-2012), and essays by Jorge Carrillo and Marcelo Sánchez-Villagra, about turtles in the Venezuelan fossil record.

At the website of Editorial La Fauna publishing, we can find this review:

References

External links
Review of the book at the Tortoise Forum
Venezuela y sus Tortugas - Goodreads
Pedro Trebbau - Official website in English

1984 non-fiction books
2016 non-fiction books
Zoology books
Fauna of Venezuela
Books about Venezuela